Janusz Kamiński is a Polish cinematographer known for his work in film and television.

Kamiński is most known for his collaborations with director Steven Spielberg. Their partnership first started in 1993 with the holocaust drama Schindler's List for which Kamiński received his first Academy Award for Best Cinematography. He won his second for Spielberg's World War II drama Saving Private Ryan (1998). He has also received Academy Award nominations for Amistad (1997), War Horse (2011), Lincoln (2012), and West Side Story (2021).

He has received five British Academy Film Award nominations for Best Cinematography winning for Schindler's List (1993). He also has received five nominations from the American Society of Cinematographers for Outstanding Achievement in Cinematography. He did receive a special prize for his Cinematography for Julian Schnabel's The Diving Bell and the Butterfly (2007), as well as an Academy Award, César Award, and ASC Award nomination.

Major associations

Academy Awards

British Academy Film Awards

American Society of Cinematographers

Industry awards

American Film Institute (AFI) Awards 
 2002: A.I. Artificial Intelligence (won)
 2010: Franklin J. Schaffner Award (won)

British Society of Cinematographers Award  
For Best Cinematography:
 1993: Schindler's List (won)
 1998: Saving Private Ryan (nomination)
 2007: The Diving Bell and the Butterfly (nomination)
 2015: Bridge of Spies (nomination)

Camerimage 
 1998: Saving Private Ryan − Golden Frog (nominated)
 2002: Atlas Award (won)
 2007: The Diving Bell and the Butterfly − Golden Frog (won)

Cannes Film Festival 
 2007: The Diving Bell and the Butterfly − Vulcan Prize for the Technical Artist (won)

César Award for Best Cinematography 
 2007: The Diving Bell and the Butterfly (nomination)

Hollywood Film Awards 
 2002: Outstanding Achievement in Cinematography
 2015: Bridge of Spies (won)

Independent Spirit Awards 
Best Cinematography:
 2007: The Diving Bell and the Butterfly (won)

Palm Springs International Film Festival 
 2000: Da Vinci's Cinematographer's Award (won)

Satellite Award for Best Cinematography  
 1997: Amistad (won)
 1998: Saving Private Ryan (nomination)
 2002: Minority Report (nomination)
 2005: Munich (nomination)
 2007: The Diving Bell and the Butterfly (won)
 2011: War Horse (won)
 2012: Lincoln (nomination)
 2015: Bridge of Spies (nomination)

Stockholm International Film Festival 
 2007: The Diving Bell and the Butterfly (won)

Critics awards

Alliance of Women Film Journalists 
 2002: A.I. Artificial Intelligence - Cinematographer of the Year (won)
Boston Society of Film Critics Award for Best Cinematography
 1993: Schindler's List (won)
 1998: Saving Private Ryan (won)
 2007: The Diving Bell and the Butterfly (won)

Broadcast Film Critics Association 
 2011: War Horse (won) - Critics Choice Award for Best Cinematography
 2012: Lincoln (nomination) - Critics Choice Award for Best Cinematography
 2021: West Side Story (nomination) - Critics Choice Award for Best Cinematography

Chicago Film Critics Association 
BEst Cinematography: 
 1993: Schindler's List (won)
 1998: Saving Private Ryan (nomination)
 2001: A.I. Artificial Intelligence (nomination)
 2002: Minority Report (nomination)
 2005: Munich (nomination)
 2007: The Diving Bell and the Butterfly (nomination)
 2011: War Horse (nomination)
 2012: Lincoln (nomination)

Dallas–Fort Worth Film Critics Association  
Best Cinematography:
 1993: Schindler's List (won)
 1998: Saving Private Ryan (won)

Florida Film Critics Circle 
Best Cinematography:
 1998: Saving Private Ryan (won)

Houston Film Critics Society 
Houston Film Critics Society Award: 
 2011: War Horse (nomination)
 2012: Lincoln (nomination)

IndieWire Critic's Poll 
 2007: The Diving Bell and the Butterfly (nomination) - Best Cinematography

International Online Film Critics' Poll 
 2002: Minority Report (nomination) - INOCA Award for Best Cinematography
 2007: The Diving Bell and the Butterfly (nomination) - INOCA Award for Best Cinematography

Los Angeles Film Critics Association 
Best Cinematography: 
 1993: Schindler's List (won)
 1998: Saving Private Ryan (won)
 2007: The Diving Bell and the Butterfly (won)

National Society of Film Critics Awards 
Best Cinematography: 
 1993: Schindler's List (won)
 1998: Saving Private Ryan (won)
 2007: The Diving Bell and the Butterfly (won)

New York Film Critics Circle  
Best Cinematography: 
 1993: Schindler's List (won)
 2021: West Side Story (won)

St. Louis Film Critics Association 
Best Cinematographer:
 2007: The Diving Bell and the Butterfly (nomination)
 2011: War Horse (nomination)

Honours and recognition 
  2008: Golden Plate Award of the American Academy of Achievement presented by Awards Council member George Lucas

References 

Lists of awards received by person